Tsvetomir Tsankov (born 6 June 1984 in Lovech) is a Bulgarian football goalkeeper who plays for Etar Veliko Tarnovo.

References

External links
Profile at football-lineups.com

1984 births
Living people
Bulgarian footballers
FC Dunav Ruse players
PFC Spartak Varna players
FC Montana players
FC Urartu players
FC Botev Vratsa players
FC Etar 1924 Veliko Tarnovo players
Neftochimic Burgas players
FC Lyubimets players
SFC Etar Veliko Tarnovo players
Expatriate footballers in Armenia
First Professional Football League (Bulgaria) players
Armenian Premier League players
Association football goalkeepers
Bulgarian expatriate sportspeople in Armenia